Bryan John Fowler (18 August 1898 – 4 December 1987) was a British polo player who competed in the 1936 Summer Olympics.

Biography
He was part of the British polo team, which won the silver medal. He played both matches in the tournament, the first against Mexico and the final against Argentina. Fowler's son, John, was a jockey and racehorse trainer, and his daughter, Jessica Harrington, is also a racehorse trainer herself.

References

1898 births
1987 deaths
Irish polo players
Olympic polo players of Great Britain
Polo players at the 1936 Summer Olympics
Olympic silver medallists for Great Britain
Olympic medalists in polo

Medalists at the 1936 Summer Olympics